Pierre Dagher (born April 23, 1963) is a Lebanese actor.

Filmography

Film
One Day I'll Leave - Mazen. 2015
33 Days - Avi. 2012
 Damascus Time

Television
Qiyamat Al Banadiq - Abu Ali Malham Qasem. 2013
Al Ghaliboun. 2011
Zero Degree Turn. 2007
Khalid ibn al-Walid - Abu Ubaidah ibn al-Jarrah. 2006
Made In Iran. 2011

Dubbing roles
Prophet Joseph - Jacob

References
General
https://www.alaraby.co.uk/miscellaneous/2015/6/2/بيار-داغر-لهذه-الأسباب-رفضت-وضع-صوتي-على-شخصية-النبي
http://www.alhayat.com/Articles/15114517/بيار-داغر----ظلمته-الدراما-اللبنانيّة-فأنصفته-السوريّة
http://www.aljaras.com/بيار-داغر-عملاق-وغشيم/
http://almadapaper.net/ar/news/498560/بيير-داغر-لـ-المدى--لن-أنسى-زيارتي-لبغدا
http://www.lahamag.com/Details/68414/بيار-داغر-يعاني-بسبب-طوني-عيسى-في-وجع-الصمت-إليكم-التفاصيل
http://www.al-akhbar.com/node/255028
http://www.elfann.com/news/show/1055648/بيار-داغر-لطالما-قلت-الدراما-اللبنانية-انها-فاشلة
http://www.annahar.com/article/210221-بيار-داغر-وأسبابه-الامنية
http://www.imdb.com/name/nm2847345/

Specific

External links

Lebanese male actors
Lebanese male voice actors
21st-century Lebanese male actors
Living people
1963 births